The Norway national under-20 football team, controlled by the Football Association of Norway, is the national football team of Norway for players of 20 years of age or under at the start of a FIFA U-20 World Cup campaign. It competes for Norway if they qualify for the FIFA U-20 World Cup through the UEFA European Under-19 Championship.

Competitive record

FIFA U-20 World Cup record

Players

Current squad 
 The following players were called up for the 2022–23 Under 20 Elite League match. 
 Match dates: 23 and 27 March 2023
 Opposition:  and 
 Caps and goals correct as of:''' 22 November 2022, after the match against .

Recent call-ups 
The following players have last been called up within the last twelve months and remain eligible for selection.

Records
FIFA U-20 World Cup
Biggest win by any team in FIFA U-20 World Cup history (12–0 win against Honduras at 2019 FIFA U-20 World Cup).

References

External links 
 FIFA Under-20 website Contains full results archive

European national under-20 association football teams
under-20